Daniele Balestri (born 8 May 1978 in Pontedera) is an Italian former professional road racing cyclist. He won the Tour du Finistère in 2004.

External links

Italian male cyclists
1978 births
Living people
People from Pontedera
Sportspeople from the Province of Pisa
Cyclists from Tuscany